Alamsyah Nasution (born June 11, 1981) is an Indonesian footballer who currently plays for PSMS Medan in the Indonesia Super League.

Club statistics

Domestic league

International cups

Hounors

Clubs
Sriwijaya FC :
Liga Indonesia Premier Division champions : 1 (2007)
Piala Indonesia champions : 3 (2007, 2009, 2010)

References

External links

1981 births
Association football midfielders
Living people
Indonesian footballers
Liga 1 (Indonesia) players
PSMS Medan players
PSPS Pekanbaru players
Sriwijaya F.C. players
People of Batak descent
Indonesian Premier Division players
Place of birth missing (living people)